Buffalo Storm were an American professional soccer team. They played for one season (1984) in the USL, with home games at All-High Stadium.

Players
 Rudy Pikuzinski 1983-84

References

Defunct soccer clubs in New York (state)
Association football clubs established in 1984
Sports in Buffalo, New York
United Soccer League (1984–85) teams
Men's soccer clubs in New York (state)
1984 establishments in New York (state)
Association football clubs disestablished in 1984
1984 disestablishments in New York (state)